Safranbolu is a town and district of Karabük Province in the Black Sea region of Turkey. The town's historic names in Greek were Theodoroupolis (Θεοδωρούπολις, i.e. city of Theodorus or female Theodora) and later Saframpolis (Σαφράμπολις). Its former  names in Turkish were Zalifre and Taraklıborlu. It was part of Kastamonu Province until 1923 and Zonguldak Province between 1923 and 1995.

According to the 2000 census, the population of the district was 47,257, of which 31,697 lived in the town of Safranbolu.

According to the Ottoman General Census of 1881/82-1893, the kaza of Safranbolu had a total population of 52,523, consisting of 49,197 Muslims and 3,326 Greeks.

The Old Town preserves many historic buildings, with 1008 registered historical artifacts. These are: 1 private museum, 25 mosques, 5 tombs, 8 historical fountains, 5 Turkish baths, 3 caravanserais, 1 historical clock tower, 1 sundial and hundreds of houses and mansions. Also, there are mounds of ancient settlements, rock tombs and historical bridges. The Old Town is situated in a deep ravine in a fairly dry area in the rain shadow of the mountains. The New Town can be found on the plateau about two kilometers west of the Old Town.

The name of the town derives from "saffron" and the Greek word polis (πόλις) meaning "city", since Safranbolu was a trading place and a center for growing saffron. Today, saffron is still grown at the village of Davutobası to the east of Safranbolu, with a road distance of 22 kilometres.

Safranbolu was added to the list of UNESCO World Heritage sites in 1994 due to its well-preserved Ottoman era houses and architecture.

History
It was founded by the Ottomans.

Gallery

Sister cities
  Elabuga, Russia.
  Ohrid, North Macedonia

Notable natives
 Karabaşzade Hüseyin Efendi (Cinci Hoca) - Mentor of Ottoman Sultan İbrahim in the 17th century
 Safranbolulu Izzet Mehmet Pasha, 18th century Ottoman Grand Vizier, in office 1794–1798
 Türker İnanoğlu (b. 1936), film producer
 Ali Gümüş (1940–2015), President of the Wrestling Commission of the International Sports Press Association (Association Internationale de la Presse Sportive, AIPS), journalist and author

See also 
 Amasya
 List of World Heritage Sites in Turkey

Notes

References

Further reading

External links

 
 Governor's official web site
 UNESCO World Heritage - Safranbolu
 Safranbolu: A Town of Traditional Houses

World Heritage Sites in Turkey
Saffron
Populated places in Karabük Province
Districts of Karabük Province